Losin' Streak is Ray Stevens' ninth studio album and his fourth for Barnaby Records, released in 1973. The second track is a re-recording of one of Stevens' songs that was included on his second album, This Is Ray Stevens (1963). Cover versions include the Everly Brothers' hit "Bye Bye Love" and singer/songwriter Freddie Hart's hit "Easy Lovin'." Both the album and the title track (the album's sole single) did not chart.

In 1974, the third track from this album, "Inside," was released along with a non-album track entitled "Everybody Needs a Rainbow" as a double A-side single.

The front and back of the album each contain one photo of Stevens playing the piano and singing into a microphone at a recording studio.

Track listing

Personnel 
 Ray Stevens – producer
Ben Tallent – engineer
John Donegan – photography

Charts 
Singles – Billboard (North America)

1973 albums
Barnaby Records albums
Ray Stevens albums